Conditional (if then) may refer to:

Causal conditional, if X then Y, where X is a cause of Y
Conditional probability, the probability of an event A given that another event B has occurred
Conditional proof, in logic: a proof that asserts a conditional, and proves that the antecedent leads to the consequent
Strict conditional, in philosophy, logic, and mathematics
Material conditional, in propositional calculus, or logical calculus in mathematics
Relevance conditional, in relevance logic
Conditional (computer programming), a statement or expression in computer programming languages
A conditional expression in computer programming languages such as ?:
Conditions in a contract

Grammar and linguistics
Conditional mood (or conditional tense), a verb form in many languages
Conditional sentence, a sentence type used to refer to hypothetical situations and their consequences
Indicative conditional, a conditional sentence expressing "if A then B" in a natural language
Counterfactual conditional, a conditional sentence indicating what would be the case if its antecedent were true

Other 
 "Conditional" (Laura Mvula song)
 Conditional jockey, an apprentice jockey in British or Irish National Hunt racing
 Conditional short-circuit current
 Conditional Value-at-Risk

See also
Condition (disambiguation)
Conditional statement (disambiguation)